Louis Albert Necker de Saussure FRSE MWS FGS (10 April 1786 – 20 November 1861) was a Swiss crystallographer and geographer.  

He is best remembered for devising the optical illusion now known as the Necker cube.

Life

He was born in the Republic of Geneva, the son of botanist Professor Jacques Necker, nephew and namesake of statesman Jacques Necker, and Albertine Necker de Saussure.

He was educated in Geneva, then sent to Edinburgh University in Scotland to study Sciences from 1806 to 1808.

He returned to Scotland in 1841 and settled on the Isle of Skye, lodging with the Cameron family at Bosville Terrace in Portree. His scientific interests turned to astronomy and a study of the aurora borealis. In 1843 and 1845, he was joined by his friend, James Forbes, a glaciologist. Together, they made the first accurate map of the Cuillins.

He spent his later life mountaineering and collecting ornithological specimens. He died in Portree on 20 November 1861. He is buried next to the Cameron family in the Portree churchyard.

Works 
Mémoire sur les oiseaux des environs de Genève, Genève : Chez J.J. Paschoud, 1823. 
Voyage en Écosse et aux Iles Hébrides. Genève, Paris, J.J. Paschoud, 1821. 
Memoire sur la vallée de Valorsine, Genève : J. Barbezat et comp., 1828. 
Mémoire sur le Mont Somma. Genève. : Barbezat et Delarue. 1828. 
Le règne minéral ramené aux méthodes de l'histoire naturelle, Paris : Levrault, 1835. 
Études géologiques dans les Alpes, Paris : Pitois : Langlois et Leclercq ; Strasbourg : Levrault, 1841.

References 

18th-century scientists from the Republic of Geneva
1786 births
1861 deaths
Fellows of the Royal Society of Edinburgh
Alumni of the University of Edinburgh
Swiss emigrants to the United Kingdom
People from the Isle of Skye